Grow into It is the second studio album from British indie rock band Doe. It was released on September 28, 2018 through Big Scary Monsters and Topshelf Records.

Track list

Personnel
Nicola Leel - guitars, vocals, keyboards
Jake Popyura - drums, vocals, percussion
Dean Smithers - guitars, keyboards
Matthew Johnson - producer, engineer, mixing
Carl Saff - mastering
Lewes Herriot - cover photography
Bri Weadock - sleeve artwork

References

2018 albums
Big Scary Monsters Recording Company albums
Topshelf Records albums